Ivo Staub (born 11 May 1995) is a Swiss swimmer. He competed in the men's 50 metre freestyle event at the 2018 FINA World Swimming Championships (25 m), in Hangzhou, China.

References

External links
 

1995 births
Living people
Swiss male freestyle swimmers
Place of birth missing (living people)